Carolina Theatre could refer to: 

Carolina Theatre (Charlotte), a performing arts venue in Charlotte, North Carolina
Carolina Theatre (Durham), a performing arts venue in Durham, North Carolina
Carolina Theatre of Greensboro, a performing arts venue in Greensboro, North Carolina
Carolina Theatre (Lumberton, North Carolina), a performing arts venue in Lumberton, North Carolina

See also
List of theaters in North Carolina
North Carolina Theatre